Mariner is a Canadian short drama film, directed by Thyrone Tommy and released in 2016. The film stars Thomas Antony Olajide as Nate, a Black Canadian student at a naval academy who begins to suffer anxiety attacks as he prepares for his final marine navigation exam.

The film premiered at the 2016 Toronto International Film Festival. It was named to TIFF's annual year-end Canada's Top Ten list of the year's best Canadian short films in 2016, and was the winner of the Lindalee Tracey Award in 2017.

References

External links

2016 films
2016 drama films
2016 short films
Black Canadian films
2010s English-language films
Canadian drama short films
2010s Canadian films